Dawn of the Dragonstar is the third studio album by the Swedish power metal band Twilight Force. It was released on August 16, 2019. It is the band's second album with Nuclear Blast Records, the first to feature vocalist Allyon, and the last to feature drummer De'Azsh. On June 7, 2019, the band revealed the first single from the album, "Night of Winterlight".

Recording and production
Most guitar solos on the album were recorded with a Fender Stratocaster tuned in fourths, which guitarist Lynd states "opened up a whole new world of possibilities for my playing". Compared to the previous albums released by the band, the recording process was slightly different: with Chrileon, all members of the band were in close proximity in Sweden. With Allyon, a native Italian, the band had to work around this. In a 2018 interview, the band gave an in-character response that "the dragons are swift and reliable. Distance is of little concern in this day and age. Dragons and Town Portal Scrolls are equally efficient in times of need."

Artwork
Like the band's last album, cover artwork was designed by Kerem Beyit. The band believes that the artwork "brilliantly captures the adventurous and magical world of the Twilight Kingdoms; and a sparkling adventure it shall be indeed."

Track listing

Personnel
Twilight Force
 Aerendir – rhythm guitars
 Allyon – lead and backing vocals
 Born – bass guitar
 Blackwald – keyboards, violin, cembalo, orchestrations, narration, choir vocals, mastering, mixing, arranging, sound design, production, cover concept, art direction, lore
 Lynd – lead guitar, acoustic guitar, lute, backing vocals, choir vocals and arrangements, orchestrations, production, mixing, cover concept, art direction
 De'Azsh – drums, percussion

Additional musicians
 Tommy Johansson – backing vocals on "Thundersword"
 Hossein Manafi-Rasi – avaz on "With the Light of a Thousand Suns"
 Ylva Eriksson – choir vocals on "With the Light of a Thousand Suns" and "Queen of Eternity"
 Andreas Olander – rhythm guitars on "Valley of the Vale"

Production
 Simone Mularoni – mastering
 Kerem Beyit – cover art, design
 Hanna Turi – sleeve design, choir vocals
 Fotograf Helene – photography

Charts

References

Twilight Force albums
2019 albums
Nuclear Blast albums